David Davis Cámara (born 25 October 1976) is a retired Spanish handball player and current coach of Al Ahly.

His usual playing position was as left winger. His last team was FC Porto in 2013. In 2014 he became assistant coach in RK Vardar from Skopje, Macedonia. In 2016 he was appointed head coach of ŽRK Vardar. Davis is of Equatorial Guinean ancestry. 
Since 2014 he has lived a new phase on the bench. He began his work as a coach in the technical team of RK Vardar together with Raúl González Gutiérrez, with whom he won the EHF Champions League in 2017 after having come close to participating in the Final Four in Cologne in the previous two seasons since the League. Macedonia. They again qualified for the EHFCL Final4 in 2018. In the summer of 2018, he took the reins of the Egyptian national team, with whom he competed at the 2019 World Cup in Denmark, achieving a historic eighth place six months later. In October 2018 he took over Telekom Veszprém. In a very complicated season, he managed to recover the team until they became champions of the Hungarian League and the SEHA League, while they managed to reach the Champions League final. The Egyptian Federation then demanded exclusivity from Davis for his project and, faced with the ultimatum, the Spaniard decided to continue as head of Telekom Veszprém. During the pandemic, in the 2019/2020 season and after the cancellation of the national competitions, the team once again earned a place in the Final4. In 2021, after losing in the quarterfinals against Nantes and lifting the Hungarian Cup, Davis disassociated himself from the Magyars. In January 2022, the Spanish coach returns to Skopje to manage RK Vardar, which at this point in the season closes its Champions League group and barely stays alive in the national competition. The team manages to get through the difficult group stage and falls to Telekom Veszprém (after starting a draw with Balaton). Despite numerous injuries and financial difficulties, the Macedonians are proclaimed champions of the League and Cup. The sanction of the EHF that prevents RK Vardar from playing in European competitions separated their paths.

Records as a Coach
 Winner Velux Champions League 2016–2017
 SEHA League 2013–2014, 2017
 Macedonian Handball Cup 2013–2014, 2014–2015, 2015–2016,2016–2017
 Macedonian Handball Super League 2014–2015, 2015–2016, 2016–2017

Records with National Team
World Championship: 1
 2005 – Túnez 
European Men's Handball Championship:1
2006 – Switzerland/ silver medal
 Gold medal Mediterranean Games 2005
 Silver medal European Championship 2006
 Gold medal Yourth European Championship 1994
 
 Campeón España Junior 1995/1996.
 Campeón de España Junior 1994/1995.
 4 Campeonatos de España en Categ. Inferiores

Records with clubs
 3 European Handball Championship 2005–2006, 2007–2008, 2008–2009
 4 ASOBAL League 2006–2007 2007–2008, 2008–2009, 2009–2010.
 5 King's Cup 2004–2005, 2007–2008, 2010–2011, 2011–2012, 2012–13.
 3 Supercup of Spain 2007–2008, 2009–2010, 2011–12.
 5 ASOBAL Cup 2002–2003, 2005–2006, 2006–2007, 2007–2008, 2010–2011.
 1 EHF Cup 1994–1995. 
 3 European Handball Supercup 2005–2006, 2006–2007, 2008–2009.
 3 IHF Super Globe 2006–2007, 2009–2010, 2012–2013.
 Runner up ASOBAL League 2005–06, 2010–11, 2011–12, 2012–13.
 Runner up Kings Cup 1999–2000, 2008–2009.  
 Runner up Spain Handball Supercup 2008–2009, 2012–13.
 Runner up ASOBAL Cup 2012–13.
 Runner up Europe Cup 2011–12.
 Runner up EHF Cup Winners' Cup 2003–2004.
 Runner up EHF City Cup 1999–2000.

References

External links
NBC Olympics Bio 

1976 births
Living people
Spanish male handball players
Liga ASOBAL players
Handball players from Catalonia
Spanish sportspeople of Equatoguinean descent
People of Liberated African descent
Handball players at the 2008 Summer Olympics
Olympic handball players of Spain
Olympic bronze medalists for Spain
BM Ciudad Real players
BM Valladolid players
Olympic medalists in handball
Medalists at the 2008 Summer Olympics
Handball coaches of international teams
BM Granollers players
FC Porto handball players
Spanish expatriate sportspeople in North Macedonia
Spanish expatriate sportspeople in Egypt
Spanish expatriate sportspeople in Hungary
Spanish expatriate sportspeople in Portugal
Spanish expatriate sportspeople in Russia
Spanish handball coaches
Expatriate handball players
21st-century African-American people